The 1998 UCI Women's Road World Cup was the inaugural edition of the UCI Women's Road World Cup. It consisted of six rounds in Australia, Europe and North America. The champion was Diana Žiliūtė, who won two rounds and finished with a points tally over double that of her nearest rival.

Races

Final classification

External links

1998 in women's road cycling
UCI Women's Road World Cup